Varus may refer to:
 Var River or Varus, a river in France
 Stura di Lanzo or Varus, a river in Italy
 Varus deformity, a medical term for the inward angulation of the distal segment of a bone or joint
 Coxa vara, affecting the hip
 Genu varum, affecting the knee
 Hallux varus, affecting the big toe
 Cubitus varus, affecting the elbow
 Club foot (talipes equinovarus), affecting the heel

People with the name 
 Publius Attius Varus (died 45 BC), Roman governor of Africa
 Publius Quinctilius Varus (46 BC–AD 9), politician and general of the Roman Empire
 Publius Quinctilius Varus the Younger (c. AD 1–27), son of Publius Quinctilius Varus
 Marcus Plancius Varus (1st century AD), politician of the Roman Empire
 Gaius Plancius Varus (1st–2nd century AD), son of Marcus Plancius Varus and politician of the Roman Empire
 Titus Clodius Vibius Varus, Roman consul, 160 AD
  Titus Vibius Varus, Roman consul, 134 AD
  Titus Vibius Varus, Roman suffect consul, 115 AD
 Alfenus Varus, 1st-century Roman jurist and possible consul
 Saint Varus (died c. AD 307), early Christian martyr, soldier from Egypt
 Varus of Laodicea, a Greek sophist